Miroslav Musil (born 5 April 1950) is a Czech former wrestler who competed in the 1972 Summer Olympics.

References

1950 births
Living people
Olympic wrestlers of Czechoslovakia
Wrestlers at the 1972 Summer Olympics
Czech male sport wrestlers